Sara Strauss (born 12 August 2002) is a German field hockey player.

Career

Club level
In club competition, Strauss plays for Düsseldorfer in the German Bundesliga.

National teams

Under–18
Felicia Wiedermann made her international debut for Germany at U–18 level. She represented the team at the 2021 edition of the EuroHockey Youth Championship in Valencia.

Under–21
In 2022, Strauss was named in the German U–21 squad for the FIH Junior World Cup in Potchefstroom.

Die Danas
Strauss made her senior debut for Die Danas in 2022. Her first appearance was during season three of the FIH Pro League, in Germany's away matches against India. In both matches, Strauss was a penalty taker for Germany in the deciding shoot-outs.

References

External links
 
 

2002 births
Living people
German female field hockey players
Female field hockey forwards